Dr. Leslie George Housden (30 October 1894 – 19 December 1963) OBE was an English medical doctor who specialised in child welfare, he also represented the United Kingdom in the Men's marathon at the 1920 Summer Olympics, held in Antwerp.

Early life
Housden was born in 1894 in Bromley, Kent and was educated at The King's School, Canterbury from 1908 to 1911. He qualified as a doctor at Guy's Hospital. At the 1920 Summer Olympics Housden came 31st in the Men's marathon at a time of 3'14:25.0, 40 minutes behind the winner.

Medical
Housden was an honorary medical advisor to the Save the Children Fund and from 1948 to 1955 was an advisor to the Ministry of Health on parentcraft. In 1944 he was appointed an Officer of the Order of the British Empire for services to child welfare.

Family
Housden had married Esther Boyt in 1926 and they had four children, a daughter Biddy died aged 16 on 9 August 1944.

Books
 The Breast-Fed Baby in General Practice - 1932
 The Art of Mothercraft - 1939
 Healthy, happy children - 1944
 Home-Life and Community
 Handbook of Parentcraft - 1948
 The Prevention of Cruelty to Children - 1955

References

1894 births
1963 deaths
Olympic athletes of Great Britain
English male long-distance runners
Athletes (track and field) at the 1920 Summer Olympics
Officers of the Order of the British Empire
People educated at The King's School, Canterbury
20th-century English medical doctors
British male marathon runners
People from Bromley